Undone is an American adult animated psychological comedy drama television series created by Kate Purdy and Raphael Bob-Waksberg, and starring Rosa Salazar. The series premiered on September 13, 2019, on Amazon Prime Video, to critical acclaim. It is Amazon's first adult animated original series and its first to use rotoscoping. In November 2019, Amazon renewed the series for a second season which premiered on April 29, 2022.

Premise
Undone explores "the elastic nature of reality through its central character, Alma. After getting into a nearly fatal car crash, Alma discovers she has a new relationship with time and uses this ability to find out the truth about her father’s death."

Cast and characters

Main
 Rosa Salazar as Alma Winograd-Diaz, a Mexican American woman who begins to develop the ability to manipulate and move through time following a car crash.
 Angelique Cabral as Becca Winograd-Diaz, Alma's younger sister who is engaged to be married.
 Constance Marie as Camila Diaz, Alma's mother who worries about Alma's mental health following her crash.
 Siddharth Dhananjay as Sam, Alma's boyfriend who she enlists to help her investigate the death of her father.
 Daveed Diggs as Tunde, Alma's boss at the daycare. (season 1)
 Bob Odenkirk as Jacob Winograd, Alma's dead father who enlists her help in investigating his death.

Supporting
 Kevin Bigley as Reed Hollingsworth, Becca's fiancé.
 Sheila Vand as Farnaz, Jacob's student and research assistant who also was killed in the crash.
 Holley Fain as Geraldine (born Ruchel) Winograd, Jacob's mother and Alma's grandmother who has the same abilities as her children and grandchildren but is institutionalized for it. Veda Cienfuegos plays a young Ruchel in her memories.
 Alma Martinez as Rosario de Alejandro, a mystic who helps Camila when she is alone and pregnant as a young woman and who assists Alma and Becca with their search.
 Jeanne Tripplehorn as Beth Hollingsworth, Reed's mother. (season 1)
 John Corbett as Layton Hollingsworth, Reed's father. (season 1)
 Tyler Posey as Father Miguel, a priest at Camila's church. (season 1)
 Brad Hall as Charlie, a mysterious person whose company originally funded Jacob's research, and whom Jacob suspects of killing him. (season 1)
 Carlos Santos as Alejandro, a mysterious man from Camila's past. (season 2)

Episodes

Season 1 (2019)

Season 2 (2022)

Production

On March 6, 2018, it was announced that Amazon had given the production a straight-to-series order for one season. The series, starring Rosa Salazar in the lead role, was created by Raphael Bob-Waksberg and Kate Purdy, who also executive produce alongside Noel Bright, Steven A. Cohen, and Tommy Pallotta. Hisko Hulsing oversaw the production design and directed a team of animators working in the Netherlands. Undones animation is created through a combination of live action motion capture and rotoscoping. Production companies involved with the series include The Tornante Company and animation companies Submarine and Minnow Mountain. On November 21, 2019, the series was renewed for a second season alongside Purdy signing an exclusive deal with Amazon. The eight-episode second season was released on April 29, 2022.

Critical reception
Undone received critical acclaim. Review aggregator website Rotten Tomatoes reports that 98% of 57 critic reviews are positive for the first season, with an average rating of 8.3/10. The website's critics consensus reads, "A kaleidoscopic existential crisis, Undone bends the rules of space, time, and rotoscoping to weave a beautifully surreal tapestry that is at once fantastical and utterly relatable." Metacritic assigned the season a weighted average score of 86 out of 100, based on 17 reviews, citing "universal acclaim".

For the second season, Metacritic collected 5 reviews and calculated an average score of 86, indicating "universal acclaim". On Rotten Tomatoes, 96% of 24 reviews are positive for the second season, with an average rating of 8.2/10. The critics consensus reads, "Undone broadens out into a family affair in a gorgeously trippy continuation that's as heady as it is moving."

Accolades

References

External links
 
 

2010s American adult animated television series
2010s American comedy-drama television series
2010s American time travel television series
2019 American television series debuts
2020s American adult animated television series
2020s American comedy-drama television series
2020s American time travel television series
Amazon Prime Video original programming
American adult animated comedy television series
American adult animated drama television series
American adult animated fantasy television series
Animated television series by Amazon Studios
English-language television shows
Fictional portrayals of schizophrenia
Magic realism television series
Existentialist television series
Psychological drama television and other works
Psychological fiction
Television about mental health
Television series by Amazon Studios
Television series by The Tornante Company
Television shows set in San Antonio